Paranormal Activity: The Ghost Dimension is a 2015 American 3D found footage supernatural horror film directed by Gregory Plotkin in his directorial debut, and written by Jason Harry Pagan, Andrew Deutschman, Adam Robitel, and Gavin Heffernan. Plotkin served as the editor for the second, third, fourth, and fifth films. Most of the film takes place after Paranormal Activity 4 (2012), though the plot ties in heavily with the events of Paranormal Activity 3 (2011).

It is the sixth installment in the Paranormal Activity series. It was released on October 23, 2015. It is the first installment not to star Katie Featherston as Katie, but she is referred to often. Most of the film involves the young 1988 Katie from the third film. The film had grossed over $78 million worldwide on a $10 million budget. The Rotten Tomatoes consensus says that the franchise's "thrills are mostly gone". Although this film was initially announced and promoted as the final film in the series, a seventh installment was released in October 2021.

Plot
In 1988, Katie and Kristi watch as Dennis' spine is crushed by a mysterious force. Grandma Lois takes the girls upstairs while the entity takes the camera with them. A man speaks to the girls about "Tobi" and how they are important to his plan.

In 2013, Ryan Fleege, his wife Emily, and their six-year-old daughter Leila are about to celebrate Christmas, when Ryan's brother Mike moves in after breaking up with his girlfriend. Along with them is Skylar, who notices that Leila is talking to an imaginary friend named Tobi. Mike finds a box of old video tapes, dating from 1988 to 1992, and a very large video camera. The tapes show a young Kristi and Katie with their mother Julie and her boyfriend Dennis in 1988, while others from 1992 are in Lois's house where the two are practicing supernatural abilities with the mysterious man. Ryan and Mike notice that the girls are seemingly aware of the pair's presence: they are able to foresee Ryan and Mike's every action as the two simultaneously watch the video.

Leila's interactions with Tobi coincide with Ryan using the old camera around the house, where he notices the camera picks up spiritual beings. He decides to record overnight to see what weird things are occurring. One night, a black figure arises out of the ground and hovers over Leila for several hours, and she eventually talks to it. Soon, Skylar is attacked by the spirit. The next night, Ryan tapes Leila sleeping, but a demonic spirit appears and forces him to drop the camera. The following day, Ryan and Emily discover a slab of concrete in the ground with Katie, Kristi and the year 1987 etched into it, and realize their house is built on the same property that Katie and Kristi used to live in before it burned down in 1992. The grown-up Katie sold the house to the family, which was built by a coven of witches called The Midwives.

Leila gradually becomes less talkative and Ryan and Emily call Father Todd. Leila attacks Todd and he is convinced that 'Tobi' is a demon linked to the cult. Ryan researches the cult, and realizes they killed a family in Nevada related to a boy named Hunter, who was born on the same day as Leila. One of the tapes also shows Hunter in 1992, despite not being born until 2005. He learns that Leila's blood is needed to finish Tobi's transformation into a physical being. One night, Leila's interaction with Tobi leads her to open a doorway to another world into which she disappears. Ryan and Emily find her and flee with her to a hotel.

Father Todd attempts to cleanse the house and trap the demon but is strangled and dragged away by Tobi, leaving the family to finish the cleansing. Ryan entraps the demon in a white sheet soaked in holy water and finishes the prayer. Leila returns to normal and the demon disappears. After thinking the ordeal is over, Skylar starts to vomit blood all over Mike, but the blood burns him, killing them both. Leila flees, and Ryan and Emily chase her but Ryan is killed when a large arm impales him through his chest. Leila sprints into the "portal" in her room with Emily following; she arrives at Kristi and Katie's mother's house in 1992, where she finds a young Katie, and confronts the "human" version of Tobi. Emily pleads with the demon to spare Leila, but is killed; her body is tossed at the camera. Leila and "Tobi" walk off as the camera cuts, ending the film.

In an alternate ending, the extermination of the demon was successful. Four months later, Emily, Ryan, and Leila have moved into a new house. While Leila is playing outside, she is seen joined hand and hand with young Katie and Kristi. While celebrating Leila’s birthday party, Emily is revealed to be pregnant. Leila blows out the candles on her cake, wishing for a baby brother. Emily states they do not know the sex of their baby yet, and the film ends.

Cast
 Chris J. Murray as Ryan Fleege
 Brit Shaw as Emily Fleege
 Dan Gill as Mike Fleege
 Ivy George as Leila Fleege
 Olivia Taylor Dudley as Skyler
 Michael Krawic as Father Todd
 Chloe Csengery as young Katie
 Jessica Tyler Brown as young Kristi
 Hallie Foote as Lois
 Don McManus as Kent
 Mark Steger as Asmodeus "Tobi" of the Book of Tobit

Production
Industrial Light & Magic created the 3D visual effects, especially for the creation of the Tobi demon.

Marketing
A teaser trailer was released on June 22, and promotional stills were released afterwards. The official first trailer was released the following day at midnight.

Release
The film was originally slated for October 25, 2013, and was then delayed to October 2014. On September 17, 2014, it was announced that the film would be subtitled The Ghost Dimension, and that it was set to be released on March 13, 2015. On January 27, 2015, Paramount Pictures announced that it had pushed the release date back to October 23, 2015, where it was finally released in 3D and RealD 3D.

In July, Paramount announced that it had struck a deal with AMC Entertainment and Cineplex Entertainment to make Scouts Guide to the Zombie Apocalypse and Ghost Dimension available digitally, 17 days after they drop below 300 theaters, as part of a larger experiment, and asked other theaters to join in. In return, Paramount would share an undisclosed portion of proceeds of the VOD revenues. Per industry sources, Paramount is giving participating exhibitors an estimated 2-4% share of their digital revenue made between the time the film drops below 300 theaters and 90 days after its opening date. Those agreeing to Paramount's formula includes AMC, Canada's Cineplex, National Amusements, and Alamo Drafthouse. But many circuits including Regal Cinema, Cinemark, and Carmike have rejected Paramount's offer to release in VOD. This would mean that Ghost Dimension will only go out in roughly 1,350 North American theaters when opening on October 23—compared to 2,883 theaters for the last title and well north of 3,000 theaters for each of the previous three films. According to early pre-release tracking, the film was pacing to open to $10–12 million in the United States and Canada—despite the fact the film had the added benefit of 3D pricing, a first for the series—compared to $18.3 million for Paranormal Activity: The Marked Ones. The reason why Paramount carried out this approach and experimented with these two younger demographic genre movies—which many believe to be a box office failure—was because of the theatrical failure of MGM's Hot Tub Time Machine 2. Rob Moore, vice chairman of Paramount Pictures said, "There is no question that we are going to do less theatrically, but I believe we will make it up digitally. This is about the long-term health of the business, so there is not this long period of time when a consumer can't watch a movie."

International
The film was released in the United Kingdom and Ireland on October 21, 2015.

Reception

Box office
, Paranormal Activity: The Ghost Dimension has grossed $18.3 million in North America and $60.6 million in other territories for a worldwide total of $78.9 million, against a budget of $10 million, making it the poorest performing film in the series.

The film opened on October 23, 2015, alongside The Last Witch Hunter, Rock the Kasbah, and Jem and the Holograms, as well as the expanded release of Steve Jobs. In its opening weekend, the film had projected to gross $10–12 million from 1,656 theaters, however, some projections had it earning only in the high-single digits. The film made $500,000 from its early Thursday screenings and $3.3 million on its first day. In its opening weekend, the film grossed $8.1 million, finishing sixth at the box office.

Critical response
On Rotten Tomatoes, the film has an approval rating of 15% based on 75 reviews and an average rating of 3.70/10. The website's critical consensus reads, "Paranormal Activity: The Ghost Dimension ties up some of the franchise's lingering questions, but six films into the series, the thrills are mostly gone." On Metacritic, the film has a score of 30 out of 100 based on reviews from 13 critics, indicating "generally unfavorable reviews". Audiences polled by CinemaScore gave the film an average grade of "C" on an A+ to F scale.

Andrew Barker of Variety wrote: "There may well be new and novel ways to spark audience shivers from not-so-bright homeowners inexplicably using their cameraphones to check out bumps in the night, but this series clearly has neither the patience nor the inclination to look for them anymore."
Justin Lowe of The Hollywood Reporter wrote: "Even at this late stage in the evolution of the franchise, logical lapses in filmmaking technique undercut the integrity of the found-footage format, but continuity was never one of the series' strong points, a shortcoming easily forgiven by fans."

Noel Murray of the Los Angeles Times gave it a positive review: "At its most basic level, the "Paranormal Activity" formula still has some kick, with its combination of creepy lo-fi video and tasteful suburbia creating some strong, unsettling dissonance."

Sequel

Although The Ghost Dimension was promoted as a final installment in the series, Paramount announced in June 2019 that a seventh installment was in development. The film was set to be released on March 19, 2021. However, in August 2020, the film was delayed to March 4, 2022. In February 2021, it was announced that William Eubank had been hired to direct the film which was written by series veteran Christopher Landon. The film was moved up to October 29, 2021 and was released straight to Paramount+.

References

External links
  (Archived)
 
 

2015 films
2015 3D films
2015 horror films
2015 psychological thriller films
American 3D films
American supernatural horror films
Paranormal Activity (film series)
Films set in 1988
Films set in 1992
Films set in 2013
Blumhouse Productions films
Paramount Pictures films
Films produced by Jason Blum
Films about time travel
Films directed by Gregory Plotkin
2015 directorial debut films
2010s English-language films
2010s American films
Found footage films